North Pumping Station is a historic pumping station located at South Bend, St. Joseph County, Indiana.  The main building was built in 1912, and is a one-story, rectangular, Classical Revival style brick building.  It has a red tile hipped roof and rests on a limestone foundation.  It features a projecting entrance pavilion with a pedimented colonnade of four limestone Ionic order columns and limestone trimmed arched window openings.

It was listed on the National Register of Historic Places in 1997.

References

Water supply pumping stations on the National Register of Historic Places
Industrial buildings and structures on the National Register of Historic Places in Indiana
Neoclassical architecture in Indiana
Industrial buildings completed in 1912
Buildings and structures in South Bend, Indiana
National Register of Historic Places in St. Joseph County, Indiana